The Joy of Sex is a 1972 illustrated sex manual by British author Alex Comfort. An updated edition was released in September 2008.

Overview
The Joy of Sex spent eleven weeks at the top of the New York Times bestseller list and more than 70 weeks in the top five (1972–1974).

The original intention was to use the same approach as such cook books as The Joy of Cooking, hence section titles include "starters" and "main courses". The book features sexual practices such as oral sex and various sex positions as well as bringing "further out" practices such as sexual bondage and swinging to the attention of the general public.

The original version was illustrated with specially commissioned illustrations by Chris Foss (black-and-white line drawings) and Charles Raymond (colour paintings) mixed with classical Indian and Japanese erotica to emphasize historical precedents for erotic illustration, out of concern of possible obscenity suits. The two artists based their work on photographs taken by Chris Foss, of Charles Raymond and his wife. The illustrations have become somewhat dated, mainly because of changes in hairstyles. Both the illustrations and text are titillating as well as illustrative, in contrast to the bland, clinical style of earlier books about sex. More recent editions feature new artwork, and added text emphasizing safer sex.

The Joy of Sex did not address homosexual sex, bondage, other BDSM activities beyond a definitional level. The book played a part in the sexual revolution.

Newer versions reversed previously-supportive positions on topics such as swinging, due to extensive textual changes made at the height of the 1980s AIDS panic.

Pocket book
A pocket book version entitled, The Joy of Sex, the Pocket Edition was also published. The book won the Bookseller/Diagram Prize for Oddest Title of the Year in 1997.

Film
In 1984, Joy of Sex based on this book was released, directed by Martha Coolidge and written by Kathleen Rowell & J.J. Salter.

Video game
In 1993, a video game adaptation of the book was released for the Philips CD-i. It is one (possibly the first) of only 27 video games to have received the Adults Only rating from the ESRB due to its strong sexual content.

Availability in public libraries
There has been controversy over The Joy of Sex in the United States.  Religious groups have fought to keep it out of public libraries.  In March 2008, the Nampa, Idaho, public library board ruled in favour of removing The Joy of Sex and The Joy of Gay Sex from the libraries' shelves, making them only available upon request in the library director's office.  The books were restored to shelves in September 2008 in response to ACLU threats of litigation.

Updated 2008 edition
Publisher Mitchell Beazley released an updated edition of the book in September 2008. The new edition was rewritten and reinvented by relationship psychologist Susan Quilliam and approved by Nicholas Comfort, the original author's son.

More material has been added to the book, and the remaining text has been rewritten from both a factual and psychological viewpoint to take into account social shifts since 1972. The new edition presents a more balanced female/male perspective and also contains 120 completely re-shot photographs and re-drawn illustrations.

The quirky style—and the message of the book, that sex is fun—remain the same. Mitchell Beazley has marketed the New Joy with the subtitle "a thinking person's guide to sex".

Publication history 
 The Joy of Sex: A Gourmet Guide to Lovemaking, 1972
 More Joy of Sex: A Lovemaking Companion to The Joy of Sex, 1973 (sequel)
 The Joy of Sex: A Gourmet Guide to Lovemaking, revised and updated edition, 1986 (revised to include AIDS)
 More Joy of Sex: A Lovemaking Companion to The Joy of Sex, revised and updated edition, 1987 (sequel; revised to include AIDS)
 The New Joy of Sex: A Gourmet Guide to Lovemaking for the Nineties, 1992 (revised to bring the science, especially the sociology, up to date)
 The Joy of Sex, 2003 (newly illustrated)
 The New Joy of Sex, by Alex Comfort and Susan Quilliam, 2008

See also 

 Human sexual activity
 The Joy of Gay Sex
 Sex-positive movement

References

External links
 The New Joy of Sex (1991) at Google Books
 "How The Joy of Sex Was Illustrated" (26 October 2011) at BBC News

1972 non-fiction books
English-language books
Literature related to the sexual revolution
Sex manuals